Ravshan Zafarobod ,(), is a football club based in Zafarobod, Tajikistan who currently play in the Tajikistan Higher League.

History

Domestic history

Current squad
''

References

External links

Football clubs in Tajikistan